Denis Larkin (8 June 1908 – 2 July 1987) was an Irish Labour Party politician and trade union official.

Early life
He was born 8 June 1908 in Rostrevor, County Down, the second of four sons of the Irish trade unionist James Larkin and Elizabeth Larkin (née Brown), the daughter of a lay baptist preacher from County Down. After the family moved to Dublin in 1909, Denis, along with his brother James Jnr attended St. Enda's School, in Rathfarnham, County Dublin, which he found austere, but given his father's reputation, it was the only school that would accept them.

Trade union activity
After leaving school, he worked in a variety of jobs, including the London Across Trading Concern. In 1928 he became an official with the Workers' Union of Ireland (WUI) (founded by his father in 1924), and had to contend with a multitude of strikes in the coal, gas, building and victualling industries. As the WUI expanded during the 1940s, he became involved in many hearings and presentations at the Labour Court, and in 1949 became district branch secretary of the union and an executive member of the Irish Trades Union Congress (ITUC), working closely with his brother James, then general secretary of the WUI, although he did not share his brother's communist sympathies. 

When James died in 1969, Denis became general secretary of the WUI, and presided over a period of expansion of the union. He served as vice-president of the Irish Congress of Trade Unions from 1973 to 1974, and as president from 1974 to 1975.

Politics
He was active in the political side of the labour movement, he was a member of the Labour party's administrative executive from 1931. He was an unsuccessful candidate 1951 general election, but was elected to Dáil Éireann as a Labour Party Teachta Dála (TD) for the Dublin North-East constituency at the 1954 general election and was re-elected at the 1957 general election. He lost his seat at the 1961 general election but was re-elected at the 1965 general election. He did not contest the 1969 general election. 

A member of Dublin Corporation for thirty years, he was chairman of the housing committee of the corporation where he sought a solution to Dublin's housing crisis. He served as Lord Mayor of Dublin from 1955 to 1956.

Later life
He retired as the general secretary of the WUI in April 1977, enabling him to pursue his love of photography. He died 2 July 1987 in Dublin, some years after the death of his wife Anne Moore, a native of Dublin and fellow party activist who had been his agent on election campaigns. They had two children.

See also
Families in the Oireachtas

References

 

1908 births
1987 deaths
Irish trade unionists
Labour Party (Ireland) TDs
Lord Mayors of Dublin
Members of the 15th Dáil
Members of the 16th Dáil
Members of the 18th Dáil
Politicians from County Dublin
Presidents of the Irish Congress of Trade Unions
People from Rostrevor
People educated at St. Enda's School